The Bowmore Sandstone Group is a sequence of metasedimentary rocks, dominantly sandstones, of probable Neoproterozoic age. Their outcrop on the island of Islay in the Inner Hebrides is entirely fault-bounded, between the Loch Gruinart Fault to the west and the Loch Skerrols Shear Zone to the east.

References

Geology of Scotland
Islay